The 2004 Southampton Council election took place on 10 June 2004 to elect members of Southampton Unitary Council in Hampshire, England. One third of the council was up for election and the council stayed under no overall control.

After the election, the composition of the council was:
Liberal Democrat 19
Labour 15
Conservative 14

Campaign
Since the last election in 2003 the Liberal Democrats had run the council as a minority administration, after Labour had previously been in charge for 19 years. The record of the Liberal Democrats for the previous year was a major issue in the election, with the Liberal Democrats pointing to investment in road repairs and in addressing anti-social behaviour, while campaigning for council tax to be replaced by a local income tax. However the Labour and Conservative parties attacked the Liberal Democrats for u-turns such as the stopping of plans for fortnightly refuse collection, charges for parking in the town centre and the dropping of schemes to close football pitches and a leisure centre.

Crucial wards in the election were seen as being Sholing and Bitterne Park. Meanwhile, as well as the three main parties, there were also candidates from the United Kingdom Independence Party, British National Party and the Green Party.

Election result
The results saw the council remain with no party having a majority, but the Labour party lost 2 seats and the Conservatives gained 2. The Liberal Democrats remained the largest party with 18 seats after gaining Coxford from Labour, but losing Bitterne Park to the Conservatives. The Conservatives grew to 14 seats after also gaining Freemantle from Labour, who thus dropped to 15 seats. The Labour group leader, June Bridle, held her seat in Sholing by 84 votes, with both Labour and the Conservatives saying that the 657 won by the United Kingdom Independence Party had probably enabled Labour to hold on there. Overall turnout in the election increased to 31.6% from 29% in 2003.

Following the election Liberal Democrat Adrian Vinson remained as leader of the council, after being confirmed by a vote of 18 to 0 at a council meeting.

Ward results

Bargate

Bassett

Bevois

Bitterne

Bitterne Park

Coxford

Freemantle

Harefield

Millbrook

Peartree

Portswood

Redbridge

Shirley

Sholing

Swaythling

Woolston

References

2004 English local elections
2004
2000s in Southampton